William Bernard McIlveney  (8 March 1867 – 23 July 1956) was a New Zealand teacher, telegraphist, local politician, policeman and police commissioner. He was born in Greymouth, New Zealand, on 8 March 1867.

In July 1927, to mark the visit of the Duke and Duchess of York to New Zealand, McIlveney was appointed a Member (fourth class) of the Royal Victorian Order (redesignated as Lieutenant of the Royal Victorian Order in 1984).

References

1867 births
1956 deaths
20th-century New Zealand politicians
New Zealand educators
People from Greymouth
New Zealand Lieutenants of the Royal Victorian Order
New Zealand Commissioners of Police